Pempelia strophocomma is a moth of the family Pyralidae. It was described by Joseph de Joannis in 1932 and is endemic in the Mascarene islands Réunion and Mauritius. Its length is about 10 mm and its wingspan is about 20 mm.

The larvae feed on Annonaceae (Annona squamosa).

See also
List of moths of Réunion
List of moths of Mauritius

References

Moths described in 1932
Phycitini
Moths of Mauritius
Moths of Réunion